Beaver Creek Falls is a small waterfall located at the confluence of Beaver and Sweet Creeks in Lane County, in the U.S. state of Oregon. The waterfall is known for joining of the two creeks becoming one intertwined waterfall.

Location 
Beaver Creek Falls is located approximately 12 miles off of Highway 126, south of Mapleton. It totals 20 feet fall in a wide cascade and is the centerpiece attraction of the Beaver Creek Falls Trail trailhead and Recreation Site.

See also 
 List of waterfalls in Oregon

References

External links 
 Sweet Creek Trail-Beaver Creek Falls Trailhead United States Department of Agriculture - Forest Service page

Waterfalls of Lane County, Oregon
Parks in Lane County, Oregon